Uttarer Sur is a 2012 Bangladeshi Bengali film written directed by Shahnewaz Kakoli. The film was produced by Impress Telefilm.

Plot

The story of the film revolves around life of a singer and her little daughter who sing (and beg) in the street to earn their living. The film shows their everyday experiences.

Cast
 Utpal
 Lucy
 Meghla

Screening
The film critically acclaimed and got huge audience response in Bangladesh. The film has been screened in different international film festivals like– Goa International Film Festival, Kolkata International Film Festival (2012), Third Eye Mumbai Film Festival (in Mumbai).

See also
 Monpura

References

External links

2012 films
Bangladeshi drama films
2012 drama films
Bengali-language Bangladeshi films
2010s Bengali-language films
Best Film National Film Award (Bangladesh) winners
Impress Telefilm films